Archi (also Romanized as Archī and Arechī) is a village in Karipey Rural District, Lalehabad District, Babol County, Mazandaran Province, Iran. At the 2006 census, its population was 668, in 172 families.

References 

Populated places in Babol County